The 1899 Geneva Covenanters football team was an American football team that represented Geneva College as an independent during the 1899 college football season. Led by Ross Fiscus in his third and final year as head coach, Geneva compiled a record of 0–3. The team's captain was William Lewis.

Schedule

References

Geneva
Geneva Golden Tornadoes football seasons
College football winless seasons
Geneva Covenanters football